Burton Albion Football Club is a professional association football club in the town of Burton upon Trent, Staffordshire, England. The team compete in League One, the third tier of the English football league system. The club moved its home ground in 2005 to the Pirelli Stadium from Eton Park. The club's nickname, The Brewers, evokes the brewing heritage of Burton upon Trent.

Burton Albion were formed in 1950 and initially joined the Birmingham & District League before switching to the Southern League eight years later. They were promoted from the Southern League Division One in 1965–66, 1971–72 and 1973–74 and were relegated from the Southern League Premier Division in 1970, 1973 and 1977. Burton spent 1979 to 1987 in the Northern Premier League, before reverting to the Southern League Premier Division. The club rejoined the Northern Premier League in 2001 and were promoted to the Conference as Northern Premier League champions in 2001–02. 

Nigel Clough spent seven seasons as the club's player-manager in the Conference and then led them into the Football League as champions of the Conference in 2008–09. They lost the 2014 League Two play-off final, but went on to win the League Two title in 2014–15 and were promoted from League One in 2015–16. Burton spent two seasons in the Championship until relegation in 2018.

History

1950–1998: Early years

Burton Albion were formed in 1950, and joined the Birmingham & District League. They finished the 1953–54 season as runners-up, and in 1958–59 joined the Southern League North Western zone. In 1965–66 Burton missed out on the runners-up place on goal difference, but were still promoted to the Southern League Premier Division. They avoided relegation in 1968, due to Stevenage Town folding, but were relegated to Division One after an unsuccessful 1969–70 season. 

Burton missed out on promotion on goal average in 1970–71, but finished as runners-up the following season and were promoted back to the Premier Division. The next two seasons saw them relegated, and then promoted back to the Premier Division again. They stayed in the same division until being relegated once more at the end of 1976–77.  League rearrangements saw Burton moved to the Northern Premier League, because of their location in the central Midlands, and then back to the Southern League in 1987–88, the season after losing in a replayed FA Trophy Final to Kidderminster Harriers.

Into the new millennium

In October 1998, Nigel Clough was appointed as player-manager and he led the club to two successive runners-up spots, in 1999–2000 and 2000–01. Burton were again moved to the Northern Premier League Premier Division in 2001–02, which they won by a margin of 15 points, scoring 106 goals in the process. The club were promoted to the Football Conference for the first time.

The club was brought to national attention when they were drawn at home against 11-times winners Manchester United in the third round of the 2005–06 FA Cup. The Brewers held the Premier League team to a 0–0 draw at home, but lost the replay 5–0 in front of over 11,000 Burton fans, setting a record for number of away fans at Old Trafford.

2009–present: Football League and rise to the Championship

In January 2009, with Burton 13 points clear at the top of the table, Clough left the club to become the manager of Derby County, with Roy McFarland installed as caretaker manager until the end of the season. Despite this managerial change, Burton went on to set a league record for the most consecutive wins, and in February 2009, when the team was 19 points clear at the top of the table, Conference sponsors Blue Square declared Burton the winners of the 2008–09 title in a public relations stunt in which they paid out all bets. Following that announcement, the club saw their lead reduced week by week, but secured promotion to the Football League in the final game of the season, despite losing 2–1 away to Torquay United when Cambridge United could only manage a goalless draw to Altrincham. At the end of the season Roy McFarland left the club and was replaced by Paul Peschisolido, with Gary Rowett acting as his assistant. 

Burton's first win in the Football League was 5–2 against Morecambe at the Pirelli Stadium and they finished 13th in their first campaign in the Football League. In their second season Burton claimed a notable scalp in the FA Cup third round when they knocked out Championship team Middlesbrough 2–1 at the Pirelli Stadium. In the league, Burton experienced a 17-game winless run and fell from fifth place on Boxing Day to 17th place at the end of the 2011–12 season, which led to the sacking of Peschisolido.

Gary Rowett was appointed as the new manager of Burton in May 2012. In his first full season in charge, he led Burton to a fourth-place finish and the play-offs, missing out on automatic promotion by two points. Burton lost their play-off semi-final 4–5 on aggregate to Bradford City despite winning the first leg 3–2 at Valley Parade. In the 2013–14 season, Burton finished sixth, reaching the play-off final in which they lost 1–0 against Fleetwood Town.

During the 2014–15 season, Rowett left to join Birmingham City, and was replaced by Jimmy Floyd Hasselbaink. Under Hasselbaink the Brewers won League Two and were promoted to League One for the first time in their history. Hasselbaink left by mutual consent in December 2015 to join Queens Park Rangers as manager. Clough returned to Burton to replace him for his second spell as manager and led the club to a second-place finish in the league, earning promotion to the Championship, another first for Burton.

The Brewers opened their first season in the Championship with a 4–3 loss to local rivals Nottingham Forest. Burton went on a six-match streak without losing between 18 February and 18 March beginning with a 2–1 win at home to ex-Premier League opponents Norwich City and culminating in a 3–5 defeat to Brentford and including a 1–0 win over Nottingham Forest in the reverse fixture. Burton secured their Championship status on 29 April 2017 after a 1–1 draw with Barnsley. Burton spent much of their second season in the Championship in the relegation zone. three wins in the late stage of the season boosted their chances of survival, including a 2–1 win over relegation rivals Sunderland. However, following a 2–1 defeat to Preston North End on the final day of the season, Burton were relegated back to League One.

In 2018–19, in spite of being in mid-table in League One, they made the semi-finals of the EFL Cup, after wins over Shrewsbury Town, Aston Villa, Burnley, Nottingham Forest and Middlesbrough. Facing Manchester City, Burton lost the first leg 9–0 at the Etihad Stadium, eventually losing 10–0 on aggregate.

Stadium

Albion began life at the Lloyds Foundry ground on Wellington Street, but high attendances meant that the club quickly searched for a more suitable home. Eton Park was built off Derby Road and officially opened on 20 September 1958, coinciding with the club's promotion to the Southern League. Until its demolition in 2005, the Brewers played all their home games at Eton Park.

The Pirelli Stadium on Princess Way was built in 2005 and is the current home of the Brewers, replacing Eton Park, also on the same road, which was demolished and developed into housing. The ground cost £7.2 million to build, and was built on the former site of the Pirelli UK Tyres Ltd Sports & Social Club. The land was donated to the club by Pirelli in return for naming rights.

The ground was designed by architect Jon Hawkeye, and has served as the inspiration for numerous newer grounds, including Morecambe's Globe Arena, and the proposed Hayes & Yeading stadium. It gained its most recent safety certificate from Staffordshire County Council on 12 July 2010, having been subject to crowd trouble on 8 May 2010 at the hands of Grimsby Town fans following their relegation from Football League Two.

The Pirelli Stadium has seen minor capacity changes since its construction, and the current capacity is 6,912, with 2,034 being seated in the South (Main) Stand. The current record attendance for the stadium stands at 6,746 for an EFL Championship match against Derby County on 26 August 2016. Previous records include 6,192 for a Conference National 1–0 defeat against Oxford United, during the club's title-winning season, and 6,191 for an FA Cup third-round match on 8 January 2006 against Manchester United.

The stadium also hosts the National ISFA Under-13 tournament final.

Rivalries

In their non-League days the Brewers' local rivals were Gresley Rovers, Nuneaton Borough, Stafford Rangers and Tamworth. However, since the club's rise to the Football League these rivalries have become less intense.

Following promotion to the Football League, local rivalries with Port Vale, Notts County, Chesterfield and Walsall have arisen.  Except for Notts County, all these clubs had been rivals to Albion's predecessor, Burton United in the early 1900s. There is also a largely friendly rivalry with Derby County, partly because of the shared fanbase, but particularly following the transfer of manager Nigel Clough to the Championship club in 2009 and the arrival of several ex-Derby players during the Paul Peschisolido era.

Their 2016 promotion into the Championship resulted in matches with local big clubs Aston Villa, Birmingham City, Derby County, Nottingham Forest and Wolverhampton Wanderers.

Players

First-team squad

Out on loan

Former players

Player of the Year
As voted for by supporters of the club.

 1971   Bobby Goodwin
 1972   Phil Annable
 1973   John Beresford
 1974   Frank Gregg
 1975   Phil Annable
 1976   Brendon Phillips
 1977   Phil Annable
 1978   Barry Alcock
 1979   Phil Annable
 1980   Ken Blair
 1981   Bryan Kent
 1982   Owen Bell
 1983   Clive Arthur
 1984   Paul Evans
 1985   Doug Newton
 1986   Alan Kamara
 1987   Alan Kamara
 1988   Ian Straw
 1989   Nick Goodwin
 1990   Nick Goodwin
 1991   Mark Owen
 1992   Nick Goodwin
 1993   Alan Kurila
 1994   Nicholas Harlow
 1995   Darren Acton
 1996   Matt Smith
 1997   Simon Redfern
 1998   Mark Blount
 1999   Mark Blount
 2000   Darren Stride
 2001   Darren Wassall
 2002   Darren Stride
 2003   Matt Duke1
 2003   Christian Moore1
 2004   Aaron Webster
 2005   Andrew Corbett
 2006   Darren Tinson
 2007   Kevin Poole
 2008   John McGrath
 2009   Jake Buxton
 2010   Tony James
 2011   Adam Legzdins
 2012   Calvin Zola
 2013   Lee Bell
 2014   Ian Sharps
 2015   Stuart Beavon
 2016   Stuart Beavon
 2017   Jackson Irvine
 2018   Lucas Akins
 2019   Lucas Akins
 2021   Ryan Edwards
 2022   John Brayford

1 Matt Duke and Christian Moore joint recipients of 2003 award.

Backroom staff

Club officials

Source: Burton Albion | Club | Who's Who

Club honours

Titles
 Winners : 2007-08
 Football League One (Level 3)
 Runners-up: 2015–16
 Football League Two (Level 4)
 Champions: 2014–15
 Football Conference (Level 5)
 Champions: 2008–09
 Northern Premier League (Level 6)1
 Champions: 2001–02
 Southern Football League Premier Division (Level 6)1
 Runners-up: 1999–2000, 2000–01
 FA Trophy
 Runners-up: 1986–87
 Southern League Cup
 Winners: 1963–64, 1996–97, 1999–2000
 Runners-up: 1988–89
 Northern Premier League Challenge Cup
 Winners: 1982–83
 Runners-up: 1986–87
 Northern Premier League President's Cup
 Runners-up: 1982–83, 1985–86
 Staffordshire Senior Cup
 Winners: 1955–56
 Runners-up: 1976–77
 Birmingham Senior Cup
 Winners: 1953–54, 1996–97
 Runners-up: 1969–70, 1970–71, 1986–87, 2007–08

Records
 Best League position: 20th Football League Championship (Level 2) – equivalent to 40th overall (2016–17)
 Best FA Cup performance: 4th Round
2010–11 (vs. Burnley)
 Best FA Trophy performance: Final
 1986–87 (After Replay) (vs. Kidderminster Harriers)
 Best Football League Cup performance: Semi-final
 2018–19  (vs. Manchester City) 
 Best Football League Trophy performance: 3rd Round
 2022–23 (vs. Accrington Stanley)
 Biggest win: 12–1 vs. Coalville Town – Birmingham Senior Cup, 6 September 1954
 Heaviest defeat: 10–0 vs. Barnet – Southern League Premier Division, 7 February 1970
 Biggest Football League win: 6–1 vs. Aldershot Town – Football League Two, 12 December 2009
 Biggest Football League defeat:
1–7 vs. Bristol Rovers – Football League Two, 14 April 2012
1–7 vs. Port Vale – Football League Two, 5 April 2013
0–6 vs. Fulham – Football League Championship, 20 January 2018
 Biggest FA Cup win: 0–4 vs. Halifax Town, 10 November 2007
 Biggest FA Cup defeat: 8–0 vs. AFC Bournemouth, 17 November 1956
 Biggest Football League Cup win: 4-0 vs. Morecambe, 27 August 2019
 Biggest Football League Cup defeat: 0–9 vs. Manchester City, 9 January 2019
 Biggest Football League Trophy defeat: 5–1 vs. Chesterfield, 1 September 2009
 Highest scoring Football League game: 5–6 vs. Cheltenham Town – Football League Two, 13 March 2010

1Before re-arrangement of non-League pyramid to include Conference North/South.Source: Burton Albion | Club | History | Honours | Club Honours

Personnel records

Goalscoring

Top goalscorers
As of 20 September 2010 (competitive matches only):

Top Football League goalscorers
As of 16 July 2022, goals not appearances, they're since 23 April 2017 (Football League matches only):

Appearances and goals count for Football League only.
Source: Burton Albion, The Football League

Other goalscoring records

 Most goals in a season: Stan Round – 59 (1965–66)
 Most goals in Football League season – Shaun Harrad – 21 (2009–10)
 Most hat-tricks: Stan Round – 12
 Most Football League hat-tricks – Greg Pearson, Shaun Harrad, Billy Kee, Lucas Akins– 1

Appearances

Most appearances
As of 15 June 2012 (competitive matches only):

Most Football League appearances
As of 23 April 2020. (Football League matches only):

Appearances and goals count for Football League only.
Source: Burton Albion, Football League

Transfers
 Highest Transfer fee paid: Liam Boyce – £500,000
 Highest transfer fee received: Jackson Irvine – £2,000,000

Full international players
Burton Albion players who have represented their country while contracted to the club.

 – Jacques Maghoma (2010)
 – Aurélien Joachim (2015)
 – Jackson Irvine (2016)
 – Lee Williamson (2016)
 – Jamie Ward (2016)
 – Tom Flanagan (2017)
 – Matthew Lund (2017)
 – Liam Boyce (2018)
 - Kieran O'Hara (2019)

Managers

References

External links

Charlie Williams at My Football Database

 
Football clubs in Staffordshire
English Football League clubs
Association football clubs established in 1950
1950 establishments in England
Southern Football League clubs
National League (English football) clubs
Sport in Burton upon Trent
Football clubs in England